The Jawa 250 was a motorcycle, produced by Jawa Moto in Czechoslovakia since 1934 until 1972 and in the Czech Republic since 1994 until 2013. As of 2019, the 250/597 Travel was equipped with the last engine of the company's own design, it was almost mechanically unchanged since the 1970s but very reliable.

Versions 

1934–1940: Jawa 250 Special
1939–1945: Jawa 250 Duplex-Blok
1946–1954: Jawa 250 Pérák
1954–1962: Jawa 250/353 Kývačka
1962–1974: Jawa 250/559 Panelka
1963–1974: Jawa 250/559 Automatic
1963–1971: Jawa 250/590 Californian
1969–1974: Jawa 250/592 Panelka
1963–1971: Jawa 250/623 Bizon
1970–1972: Jawa 250/623 UŘ
1994–2000: Jawa 250/593 Vodník
2007–2013: Jawa 250/597 Travel

Images

See also
Jawa 350

References 

250
Sport bikes